Star trucks can mean either:

 FSC Star, a Polish truck manufacturer, or
 Western Star Trucks, an American heavy truck manufacturer
 Astra Veicoli Industriali, Italian truck manufacturer, a subsidiary of IVECO